William Latymer or Latimer (1499–1583) was an English evangelical clergyman, Dean of Peterborough from 1560. He was chaplain to Anne Boleyn, and is best known for his biography of her, the Chronickille of Anne Bulleyne.

Life
He was the third son of William Latymer of Freston, Suffolk, and his wife Anne, daughter of Edward Bokinge of Ashbocking, Suffolk.

He was among the group of evangelicals, including Thomas Cranmer and Matthew Parker, who gathered round Anne Boleyn as Queen and patron of the reformers. He became one of her chaplains; Hugh Latimer apparently did not, though the coincidence of names has led to confusion on this point. In 1535 Latymer was arrested at Sandwich, bringing forbidden books of Protestant reformers into the country. Anne Boleyn was already detained on the charges that would bring about her death. Latymer was allowed to send his books ahead, to Joan Wilkinson. His reputation was not damaged. He graduated M.A. 1536 at Corpus Christi College, Cambridge; this was by special grace after seven years of study.

He was rector of Witnesham, Suffolk, from 1538 to 1554, presented by Edward Latymer, and also in 1538 was appointed by the king Master of the College of St Laurence Pountney, though this appointment was ended in 1547, since Edward VI dissolved the College and sold it to John Cheke. He became involved in the trial and downfall of Edmund Bonner, after Bonner's Paul's Cross sermon of 1 September 1549 was the subject of a complaint by Latymer and John Hooper, who were monitoring it. Latymer made no objection to the dissolution, and with others received a pension. Under Queen Mary, he lost a number of preferments.

The Chronickille was written for Elizabeth I of England, and concentrates on the religious aspects of her mother Anne Boleyn's life. Prominent in the Queen's 1564 visit to Cambridge, he was Clerk of the Closet and D.D.

Family
He married Ellen or Helena (died 1603); her son Edmund English from a previous marriage (died 1603), was a benefactor of Emmanuel College, Cambridge. He was father of the benefactor Edward Latymer, who was his eldest son.

Notes

1499 births
1583 deaths
16th-century English Anglican priests
Deans of Peterborough
English chaplains
Christian chaplains
English biographers
16th-century English writers
16th-century male writers